Central Butte is a town in Saskatchewan, Canada, approximately  from Saskatoon, Regina and Swift Current and  from Moose Jaw. Thunder Creek, a major tributary of the Moose Jaw River, begins west of the community. The town is served by the Central Butte Airport (TC LID: CJC4).

History
The first settlers arrived to farm in the Central Butte area in 1905, the same year Saskatchewan became a province. In 1906 a store and post office were established. A railway from Moose Jaw made it to the Central Butte area at the end of 1914, meaning the  trips to Craik for supplies were no longer necessary. After the railway arrived, a permanent township was chosen and businesses moved in to the area.

Demographics 

Recreation and clubs
4-H
Kin Canada
Lions Club
Royal Canadian Legion
Butte Junction Dance
Curling
Figure skating
Karate
Minor ball
Minor hockey
Seniors activities
Senior hockey
Volleyball

Notable people
 James Alcock - professor of psychology, author
 Ron Atchison - Saskatchewan Roughriders defensive lineman
 Blair Jones - professional hockey player
 R. Harlan Smith - country singer
 Clarke Wilm - professional hockey player

See also 
 List of communities in Saskatchewan
 List of towns in Saskatchewan

References 

Enfield No. 194, Saskatchewan
Towns in Saskatchewan